The 2001–02 season in Dutch football was the 46th season in the Eredivisie, where Ajax claimed the double (the Eredivisie title and KNVB Cup).

Johan Cruijff-schaal

Eredivisie

Champions League : Ajax and PSV
Champions League qualification : Feyenoord
UEFA Cup : Heerenveen, Vitesse and Utrecht
Promotion / relegation play-offs ("Nacompetitie") : FC Den Bosch and Sparta Rotterdam
Relegated : Fortuna Sittard

Top scorers

Awards

Dutch Footballer of the Year
 2001–02 — Pierre van Hooijdonk (Feyenoord)

Dutch Golden Shoe Winner
 2001 — Johann Vogel (PSV)
 2002 — Cristian Chivu (Ajax)

Ajax winning squad 2001–02

Goal
 Joey Didulica
 Fred Grim
 Bogdan Lobonț

Defence
 André Bergdølmo
 Cristian Chivu
 Tim de Cler
 John Heitinga
 John O'Brien
 Petri Pasanen
 Mitchell Piqué
 Hatem Trabelsi

 Ferdi Vierklau
 Abubakari Yakubu

Midfield
 Daniel Cruz
 Tomáš Galásek
 Cedric van der Gun
 Jan van Halst
 Richard Knopper
 Maxwell
 Steven Pienaar
 Stefano Seedorf
 Rafael van der Vaart
 Richard Witschge

Attack
 Shota Arveladze
 Mido
 Zlatan Ibrahimović
 Pius Ikedia
 Nikos Machlas
 Andy van der Meyde
 Wamberto

Management
 Co Adriaanse (Coach)
 Peter Boeve (Assistant)

During the season replaced by:
 Ronald Koeman (Coach)
 Ruud Krol (Assistant)
 Tonny Bruins Slot (Assistant)

Eerste Divisie

Promoted : Zwolle
Promotion / Relegation play-offs ("Nacompetitie") : Excelsior, RBC, ADO, Emmen, Volendam and Cambuur

Top scorers

Promotion and relegation

Group A

Group B

Promoted : RBC Roosendaal and Excelsior
Relegated : FC Den Bosch and Sparta Rotterdam

KNVB Cup

Dutch national team

See also
Sparta Rotterdam season 2001–02

References
 RSSSF Archive
 Voetbalstats